Sievert is a low German given name or a surname.

Variants 
 Danish: Sivart, Sivert
 Faroese: Sívar
 Norwegian: Siver, Sivert, Syver, Syvert
 Swedish: Sifuert, Sivar, Sivard, Siver, Sivert, Severt, Sigvard, Sigurd

Origin and meaning 
The name Sievert is the low German version of the name Siegward. Both names descend from the old high German terms "sigu" (victory) and "wart" (guardian).

Saint's days 
 Sweden: 25 February (Sivert)
 Norway: 2 April (Sivert)

Sources 

Low German given names
Surnames from given names